John Anson Ford (September 29, 1883 – November 3, 1983) was an American journalist, advertising executive and Democratic Party politician. He was a long-serving member of the Los Angeles County Board of Supervisors.

Career and politics
Ford was born in Waukegan, Illinois. He attended Beloit College in Beloit, Wisconsin, taught history and economics, then moved to Chicago, where he worked on the Chicago Tribune. He was on the editorial board of Popular Mechanics. In 1920 he came to Los Angeles and entered the advertising and publicity business.

Ford represented District 3 on the Los Angeles County Board of Supervisors from 1934 to 1958. He was active in Democratic Party politics, serving on the state Central Committee, as chair of the Los Angeles County Democratic Party, as delegate to Democratic National Conventions from California, Democratic candidate for U.S. Senator from California, 1940, and as  chairman of the Southern California Citizens for Kennedy Committee. On his motion, in 1944, the Board of Supervisors established the Joint Committee for Interracial Progress that later became the Human Relations Commission.

After retiring, Ford "wrote regular newspaper columns and continued to give service to the community at large." The John Anson Ford Human Relations Award is named for him, as are the John Anson Ford Amphitheatre in Los Angeles, and John Anson Ford Park in Bell Gardens, California.

John Anson Ford died at Midway Hospital in Los Angeles. He is buried in Forest Lawn Memorial Park, Glendale.

Bibliography
"Thirty Explosive Years in Los Angeles County", University of California Press, 2010

References

External links

Transcript of an eight-hour interview – Ford discusses his life and career in Los Angeles, at The UCLA Oral History Program.

1883 births
1983 deaths
People from Los Angeles County, California
People from Waukegan, Illinois
Beloit College alumni
Writers from California
Writers from Illinois
Los Angeles County Board of Supervisors
California Democrats
Burials at Forest Lawn Memorial Park (Glendale)
20th-century American politicians
American centenarians
Men centenarians